Dipo Doherty is a Nigerian painter.

Education and career 
Born in 1991, Dipo holds a Bsc. in Mechanical engineering from the University of Virginia. He completed his master's degree in Integrated Design and Management from Massachusetts Institute of Technology. His work centers around spatial geometry.

Awards and exhibitions 
He was selected as one of the exhibitors at ART X Lagos 2017. His works were part of the artworks donated at the Arthouse's Affordable Art Auction for charity in Lagos. He was nominated for the Visual Art category at The Future Awards Africa 2019.

References 

Living people
21st-century Nigerian painters
University of Virginia School of Engineering and Applied Science alumni
1991 births
Date of birth missing (living people)
Place of birth missing (living people)
Massachusetts Institute of Technology alumni